"Surfin' U.S.A." is a song by the American rock band the Beach Boys, credited to Chuck Berry and Brian Wilson. It is a rewritten version of Berry's "Sweet Little Sixteen" set to new lyrics penned by Wilson and an uncredited Mike Love. The song was released as a single on March 4, 1963, backed with "Shut Down". It was then placed as the opening track on their album of the same name.

The single peaked at number two on the chart of the Music Vendor trade paper (within a year renamed Record World) and at number three on the Billboard and Cash Box charts. Billboard ranked "Surfin' U.S.A." the number 1 song of 1963: although it was Billboards original number 1 song of the year, later lists from Billboard rank "Sugar Shack" by Jimmy Gilmer and the Fireballs as the number 1 song of 1963. It has since become emblematic of the California Sound, and "Surfin' U.S.A"'s depiction of California is emblematic of the genre. Professor Dale Carter notes that the Beach Boys' lyrics depict them as “enjoying all the material benefits of the promised land (typified by southern California) … liberty and security are accommodated at drive-in and drag strip, on surf board and in T-Bird, from hamburger stand to beach party...". This theme is present in "Surfin' U.S.A," as well as other Beach Boys' songs.

Composition 

The song features Brian Wilson's surfing-related lyrics set to the music and basic lyrical structure of Chuck Berry's "Sweet Little Sixteen". According to Wilson

With this idea, "Surfin’ U.S.A" uses the comparison of California to the rest of the United States to drive its stereotypical images of California. The song opens by posing an alternative reality: “If everybody had an ocean across the USA, then everybody’d be surfin’ like Californi-a.” These opening lyrics show California in a favorable light, theorizing that if everyone in the United States had the same California-like privileges to a beach, they would enjoy going surfing. 

Additionally, Surfin’ U.S.A uses a recognizable steady, upbeat drum tempo seen in many Surf Rock songs that seems to “drive” the music forward. The Beach Boys popularized this unique drum style, and is reminiscent of “a locomotive getting up to speed”. This technique was seen earlier in Jan & Dean’s 1963 hit “Surf City”, which was the first Surf song to achieve the number one position on the Billboard Hot 100.

Authorship
When the single was released in 1963, the record only listed Brian Wilson as the composer although the song was published by Arc Music, Chuck Berry's publisher. Later releases, beginning with Best of The Beach Boys in 1966, listed Chuck Berry as the songwriter. Later releases list both writers although the copyright has always been owned, since 1963, by Arc Music. Under pressure from Berry's publisher, the Wilsons’ father and manager, Murry Wilson, had given the copyright, including Brian Wilson's lyrics, to Arc Music prior to the release of the single.

Despite tensions with Berry at the time, Carl Wilson said the Beach Boys "ran into Chuck Berry in Copenhagen and he told us he loves 'Surfin' U.S.A.'."

In 2015, Mike Love stated that "Surfin' U.S.A." was one of many Beach Boys songs he helped write but for which he did not receive credit. Love claimed he wrote the lyrics to the song but was not able to be credited in his successful lawsuit against Wilson and Almo/Irving Music in 1994 because the copyright was owned by Arc Music. In a 1974 radio interview, Brian said "When we first got going, Mike was a Chuck Berry fan, so ... he and I turned the lyrics into a surfing song."

Surfing spots 
In the song the following surfing spots are mentioned, mostly in California, as well as one in Hawaii (possibly two) and one in Australia:

Reception 

The "Surfin' U.S.A." single, backed with "Shut Down", was released under Capitol Records in the United States in March 1963. The song peaked on the Billboard pop chart at number three, the band's first top ten hit therein (see also Surfin' Safari). The B-side charted at number 23. Although the double-sided hit single registered in Billboard as number one in chart points at the end of the year (tabulated up to mid November 1963) and was cited by Billboard as "best-selling record of the year", in a low-selling year for singles in the US it apparently did not initially sell a million copies—and has never been issued an RIAA Gold Disc award. The song was re-issued in the U.S. as a single in July 1974 backed with "The Warmth of the Sun". That single also hit the Billboard Hot 100 chart, peaking at 36.

Cash Box described it as "a pounding 'Sweet Little Sixteen'-flavored rocker...that the Beach Boys belt out with coin-catching enthusiasm" and added that it is a "terrific instrumental showcase."

In the United Kingdom, the single was released in June 1963. The third single by the band to be issued in the UK, it became the first single to chart. It peaked at 34 (28 in the New Musical Express).

In Australia, the single was released in 1963 and peaked at 9, becoming the band's first single to chart in Australia. The single was re-released in Australia in 1974 and again charted, peaking at 66. In Canada and Sweden, the single was released in 1963 and peaked on the charts at 6 in both countries. In July 1963, in the national charts used by Billboard, it peaked at #9 in Hong Kong, #8 in Austria the following month; in August 1964 at #9 for two weeks in Japan.

Variations 

The song was first released on an album as the title track on the band's 1963 album Surfin' U.S.A. In May, 2003 Capitol issued the song on an EP along with "Surfer Girl", "Don't Worry, Baby", and "The Beach Boys Medley". However, the record failed to make an impact on the charts.

A demo version of the song featuring only Brian Wilson singing and playing piano was released on the 1993 box set, Good Vibrations: Thirty Years of The Beach Boys. A different demo version, in which Wilson is joined by drums was released on the 2001 archival release Hawthorne, CA. Both demos feature similar minor lyrical differences from the final recording.

The instrumental track of the final recording was also released on the Hawthorne, CA album. This version of the cut does not 'fade out', but continues on well past the original ending of the song until it ends abruptly.

Live performances 
After being released the song became a concert regular for the band. The band recorded live versions of "Surfin' U.S.A." on several Beach Boys albums. It was first released on The Beach Boys in Concert album. A concert from Anaheim Stadium on July 3, 1976, which featured the song was filmed and produced by Lorne Michaels for a Beach Boys television special which first aired in the United States in August, 1976. The TV special was later released on VHS and DVD as Good Vibrations Tour. In 1980, a live rendition was recorded, though not released until 2002 on the Good Timin': Live at Knebworth England 1980 live album. Footage from the concert was also released on VHS and DVD format. A live version was also released on the band's 1993 box set Good Vibrations: Thirty Years of The Beach Boys.

The band also performed a live version of the song at the NBC Television Studios in Burbank, California, which was filmed on March 14, 1964. Footage of the concert was later released on the DVD The Lost Concert. The band performed the song on The T.A.M.I. Show which was filmed at the Santa Monica Civic Auditorium on October 28 and 29, 1964, and featured other top artists of the day such as Chuck Berry, Marvin Gaye, The Supremes, James Brown & The Famous Flames and The Rolling Stones. The concert was released as a film in 1964 featuring the Beach Boys performance. However, after the initial showing of the film Brian insisted that the band's performance be cut from the film. Because of a rights dispute the footage of the Beach Boys' performance does not appear in most versions of The T.A.M.I. Show. The footage was eventually released on the DVD Sights of Summer included with the special 2004 edition of Sounds of Summer: The Very Best of The Beach Boys.

Personnel 
According to Jon Stebbins:

The Beach Boys

 Mike Love – lead vocal
 David Marks – backing vocal, rhythm guitar
 Brian Wilson – backing vocal, bass guitar, organ
 Carl Wilson – backing vocal, lead guitar

Additional musicians

 Frank DeVito – drums

Charts

Certifications

Leif Garrett version

In August 1977, Leif Garrett released his version as the first single from his eponymous debut album. It reached No. 20 on the Billboard Hot 100 and No. 4 in Switzerland.

Sources

1963 songs
1963 singles
1977 singles
Songs written by Brian Wilson
Songs written by Chuck Berry
The Beach Boys songs
Jan and Dean songs
Leif Garrett songs
Alvin and the Chipmunks songs
Song recordings produced by Nick Venet
Song recordings produced by Michael Lloyd
Capitol Records singles
Atlantic Records singles
Songs about the United States
Songs about California
Songs involved in plagiarism controversies
California Sound